Bhandara Basadi or Chaturvimsati Tirthankar Basadi  is a Jain temple (basadi) built in located in Shravanabelagola, a town in Karnataka, India.

History 
The temple was constructed in 1159 CE by Hula Raja, a general and bhandari during the reign of King Narasimha I of Hoysala Empire, giving temple the name Bhandara Basadi. According to inscription, dating back to 1159 CE, inside the temple gave grants for the temple and gave the name Bhavya-Chamundi temple. One inscription inside the temple records a major dispute between Vaishnav and Jain and its resolution by King Bukka of Vijayanagara Empire.

Architecture 

The temple is dedicated to 24 Tirthankaras and is hence also known as Chaturvimsati Tirthankar Basadi. The garbhagriha houses  idols of 24 Tirthankaras in kayotsarga posture with a ornate pedestal. There are idols of Padmavati and Brahmdev outside the garbhagriha. The central part of navaranga (hall) floor contains a  monolithic slab which popular in Hoysala architecture.

The temple also includes a monolithic manasthamba with chaturmukha idol facing four cardinal direction.

See also 
 Akkana Basadi
 Gommateshwara statue
 Chandragupta basadi
 Chavundaraya Basadi

References

Citations

Sources

External links

Jain temples in Karnataka
12th-century Jain temples